George Beckwith may refer to:

George Beckwith (British Army officer) (1753–1823), British officer and colonial governor
George Beckwith (Carl Jung associate) (1896–1931), American who accompanied psychologist Carl Jung on his African expedition